Eugnosta argyroplaca is a species of moth of the family Tortricidae. It is found in Arizona.

References

Moths described in 1931
Eugnosta